Erik Loe may refer to:

Erik Loe (editor) (born 1920), Norwegian journalist
Erik Loe (football) (born 1957), Norwegian sports official